Ilunga Mande Zatara (born 12 March 1983 in Kipushi, DR Congo) is a DR Congolese runner. He competed at the 2012 Summer Olympics in the marathon event and was flag bearer for the Democratic Republic of the Congo team at the opening ceremony. He did not finish the event.

References 

1983 births
Living people
People from Haut-Katanga Province
Democratic Republic of the Congo male marathon runners
Olympic athletes of the Democratic Republic of the Congo
Athletes (track and field) at the 2012 Summer Olympics
21st-century Democratic Republic of the Congo people